The Citadel Mall is one of the two enclosed shopping malls of Colorado Springs.

History
Construction on the Citadel Mall began in 1970, and it opened on March 1, 1972, anchored by a JCPenney and Denver Dry Goods store, and included a two screen movie theater. The original mall consisted of 2 levels and 594,800 square feet of leasable space.

By 1980, The Rouse Company owned the mall. In 1984, the mall was expanded westward with a two level extension which included a third anchor store, May-Daniels & Fisher aka May D&F, and the creation of a two level food court. The mall's last expansion occurred in 1995 with the opening of a three level Dillard's at the end of the western extension.

In 1997, it was sold to The Macerich Company, a company based in California. In January 2007, the mall was sold to Midwest Mall Properties, a private investor group, which retained Macerich as management company.

Although many stores surround the actual mall, the entire campus is located at the intersection of Platte and Academy. When the mall originally opened it was on the eastern edge of the city.

From November 18 thru December 25, 2005, for the 50th anniversary of the NORAD Tracks Santa program, the Citadel Mall had a massive Santa Tracking Village that included a 25-foot tree, a tracking map and viewfinder where visitors could watch a NORAD Tracks Santa video, hear audio messages of peace from children around the world, and receive a 24-page coloring book with Santa's assistants wearing NORAD patches.

In September, 2006, the Foley's store at the mall was rebranded Macy's, in accordance with a national renaming. Steve & Barry's closed their store in 2008 after bankruptcy, and Macy's closed their store at the Citadel in 2009 due to poor sales.

In 2015, Dillard's was downgraded to a clearance center closing the upper two floors.

In 2020, JCPenney was put up for sale but remains open.

Current anchors
 Burlington
 Dillard's Clearance Center (180,000 sq ft.)
 JCPenney (192,758 sq ft.)

Former anchors
 Denver Dry Goods
 Foley's formerly May D&F
 Macy's
 Mervyn's

References

Shopping malls in Colorado
Buildings and structures in Colorado Springs, Colorado
Economy of Colorado Springs, Colorado
Tourist attractions in Colorado Springs, Colorado
Shopping malls established in 1972
Namdar Realty Group